Stickle may refer to:

Stickle Tarn, Langdale, a small tarn in the Lake District, England
Stickle Ridge, on James Ross Island near Antarctica
Beverly Ann Stickle, a character on the American television show The Facts of Life
George Stickle, a character in the film The Incredible Mr. Limpet
Bruno Von Stickle, a character in the movie Herbie Goes to Monte Carlo

See also
Stickle bricks, a construction toy
Great Stickle, a fell in the Lake District, England
Stickles, a surname